Vladislav Ivanovich Galkin (born 3 April 2002) is a Russian football player. He plays for FC Dynamo Moscow.

Club career
He made his debut for the main team of FC Dynamo Moscow on 22 September 2021 in a Russian Cup game against PFC Dynamo Stavropol. He made his Russian Premier League debut for Dynamo on 21 November 2021 in a game against FC Arsenal Tula.

On 15 February 2022, Galkin extended his contract with Dynamo until the end of the 2023–24 season and was loaned to FK RFS in Latvia until 30 November 2022.

Career statistics

Club

References

External links
 
 
 

2002 births
People from Krasnogorsk, Moscow Oblast
Sportspeople from Moscow Oblast
Living people
Russian footballers
Russia youth international footballers
Association football midfielders
FC Dynamo Moscow players
FK RFS players
Russian Premier League players
Russian Second League players
Russian expatriate footballers
Expatriate footballers in Latvia
Russian expatriate sportspeople in Latvia